The 2023 Nevada Wolf Pack football team will represent the University of Nevada, Reno as a member of the Mountain West Conference during the 2023 NCAA Division I FBS football season. The Wolf Pack expect to be led by Ken Wilson in his second year as Nevada's head coach. They play their home games at Mackay Stadium in Reno, Nevada.

Schedule

References

Nevada
Nevada Wolf Pack football seasons
Nevada Wolf Pack football